Red Apples Falling is a feature film directed by Ethan Higbee and starring Jim Jones and members of Dipset ByrdGang.  The film was produced by Damon Dash and Adam Bhala Lough. The film premiered at the New York International Latino Film Festival on July 30, 2009.

References

External links
 

2009 films
2000s English-language films